Alamein to Zem Zem is a military memoir of the Western Desert campaign of World War II written by the British soldier-poet Keith Douglas shortly before his death in action in Normandy in June 1944. It was first published in 1946.

The book is mainly a personal account of Douglas’s experiences as a young tank commander in the Sherwood Rangers Yeomanry with the British Eighth Army at the Second Battle of El Alamein in October–November 1942. Zem Zem is the name of a wadi in Tunisia where Douglas was wounded in early 1943.

Desmond Graham, Douglas’s biographer and editor, wrote: “This narrative, like his poems of the Desert War, is unique in the literature of its period, in that no other British poet of Douglas’s quality had battle experience and survived long enough to write of it.”

Alamein to Zem Zem was first published by Editions Poetry London in 1946 and republished by Faber and Faber (1966), Penguin Modern Classics (1969), Oxford University Press (1979) and again by Faber and Faber (1992).

References

1946 books
Military memoirs
World War II memoirs